Milton is a town in Norfolk County, Massachusetts, United States and an affluent suburb of Boston. The population was 28,630 at the 2020 census. Milton is the birthplace of former U.S. President George H. W. Bush, and architect Buckminster Fuller. Milton was ranked by Money as the 2nd, 7th, 8th, and 17th best place to live in the United States in 2011, 2009, 2019, 2021, and 2022 respectively.

Milton is located in the relatively hilly area between the Neponset River and Blue Hills, bounded by Brush Hill to the west, Milton Hill to the east, Blue Hills to the south and the Neponset River to the north. It is also bordered by Boston's Dorchester and Mattapan neighborhoods to the north and its Hyde Park neighborhood to the west; Quincy to the southeast; Randolph to the south, and Canton to the west.

History

Indigenous peoples
The area now known as Milton was inhabited for tens of thousands of years prior to European colonization. The Paleoamerican archaeological site Fowl Meadows lies within the bounds of present day Milton, with charcoal remains dated to 10,210±60 years before present in 1994, later calibrated to 12,140 years before present.

At the time of European exploration and settlement in the early 1600s, the area was inhabited by the Neponset tribe of the Massachusett, an Algonquian people, who referred to the area that would become Milton as 'Unquatiquisset,' meaning 'Lower Falls', denoting the place where the rapids of the Neponset River meet Massachusetts Bay.

During the spring and summer, the Neponset would settle at the coastal salt marshes of the Neponset River and Squantum, living off the plentiful supply of seafood and coastal sustenance. In the fall and winter, they would migrate inland to the Blue Hills to hunt game in the thickly forested hills. Though they migrated according to the local seasons and climate, they also practiced agriculture, cultivating squash, pumpkins, Northern flint corn, tobacco, and various native fruits such as blueberries, blackberries, strawberries, chestnuts, and acorns. To navigate the many rivers of eastern Massachusetts, they used the abundant trees from the vast forests to make dugout canoes.

Massachusett, the indigenous name for the Great Blue Hill, was the largest of the cluster of hills along the southern coast of Massachusetts Bay. As the second-highest elevation in all of Eastern America directly on the Atlantic coast, it possessed a sacred status in the religion of the Massachusett people. Beyond being a sacred site, the various hills were mined extensively by the indigenous inhabitants due to the abundance of a type of rare stone formed by the volcanic eruption of Massachusett 200 million years ago that was highly favorable for stone tools. These tools were traded among the indigenous people of the Northeast due to the rarity of the stone. This also indicates that the trade networks of the indigenous Northeast were far more expansive than previously thought.

At the time of the first European contact, the Neponset tribe was led by the sachem Chickatawbut, who died along with many other Neponset in a large virgin soil epidemic of the introduced European disease smallpox in November 1633 and was succeeded by his brother Cutshamekin.

English colonization
The area that became Milton began to be sparsely settled by English colonists in the late 1620s and early 1630s as a part of Dorchester, but was formally established as an organized settlement in 1640 by Puritans from England. Richard Collicott, one of the first English settlers, built a trading post near the Neponset River, and negotiated the purchase of Milton from Sachem Cutshamekin.

Many of the initial English settlers arrived during the 1650s, fleeing the aftermath of Oliver Cromwell's deposition from power and the English Civil War. Many early Puritan families of Milton would later become influential in the Massachusetts Bay Colony, including the Sumners, Houghtons, Hutchinsons, Stoughtons, Tuckers, Voses, Glovers, and Babcocks. The original name for the area, translated to "Lower Falls" was adapted as "Lower Mills" after the establishment of Israel Stoughton's Grist Mill in 1634, the earliest mill in the United States. Furthermore, in 1640, English settlers began shipbuilding at Gulliver's Creek, a tributary of the Neponset, using the innumerable quantity of Eastern white pines found in early Milton's dense forests.

In 1662, "that part of the Town of Dorchester which is situated on the south side of the Neponset River commonly called 'Unquatiquisset' was incorporated as an independent town and named Milton in honor of Milton Abbey, Dorset, England." A powder mill established in 1674 may have been the earliest powder mill in the colonies, taking advantage of the town's water power sites. Boston investors, seeing the potential of the town and its proximity to the city, provided the capital to develop 18th-century Milton as an industrial area, including an iron slitting mill and sawmills, and the first chocolate factory in New England (the Walter Baker Chocolate Factory) in 1764, which was converted from the old Stoughton Grist Mill. Through the efforts of Daniel Henchman the first paper mill to appear in New England was at Milton on the Neponset River in 1729. From its earliest days, Milton's favorable location at the rapids of the Neponset River made it one of the earliest and most active industrial areas in the United States.

The Suffolk Resolves, one of the earliest attempts at negotiations by the American colonists with the British Empire were signed in Milton in 1774, and were used as a model by the drafters of the Declaration of Independence in 1776. The Suffolk Resolves House, where the Resolves were passed, still stands and it is maintained as the headquarters of the Milton Historical Society. At the time of the Resolves it was owned by Capt. Daniel Vose, a well-known businessman, and later a representative to the Provincial Congress. The house was moved to a new location at 1370 Canton Avenue in Western Milton in order to save it from demolition at its previous location in "Milton Village" at Lower Mills. They were the "Suffolk Resolves" because Milton was part of Suffolk County until 1793, when Norfolk County split off, leaving only Boston and Chelsea in Suffolk County.

Milton became an active site for important power players in colonial Massachusetts. John Hancock purchased a large hill, today called Hancock Hill,  in the Blue Hills Reservation and planted orchards as well as harvested wild blueberries which grow abundantly at the summit. Two royal governors of Massachusetts, Jonathan Belcher and Thomas Hutchinson, had houses in Milton. The Governor Belcher House dates from 1777, replacing the earlier home destroyed by a fire in 1776, and it is privately owned on Governor Belcher Lane in East Milton.

Thomas Hutchinson maintained a summer estate called Unquity at the peak of Milton Hill, and during the increasingly violent revolutionary insurrections in Boston, he fled to Milton after his townhouse in the North End was burned by a mob and he was driven from the city after citizens learned he supported the suppression of Massachusetts by the British following the Boston Tea Party. Although Hutchinson's mansion house was demolished in 1947, Governor Hutchinson's Field, owned by the Trustees of Reservations today is a meadow on Milton Hill, with a view of the Neponset River estuary and the skyscrapers of Boston six miles (10 km) away. Both the neighboring house in which Hutchinson lived during the construction of his mansion and the barn of the estate still stand and are both privately owned. The last remnant of Unquity is the ha-ha wall, once a part of the estate's opulent gardens. Both Governor Belcher's house and Governor Hutchinson's field are on the National Register of Historic Places.

After American independence

Following the revolution, Milton continued to be a thriving agricultural and industrial town, greatly influenced both socially and economically by the prosperity of Boston and the newly-forged American identity.

The town grew extremely wealthy in the late 18th and early 19th century with the booming China Trade and the industrialization of Massachusetts during the early Industrial Revolution. As a result, much of Boston's elite built opulent country estates set on vast grounds throughout the idyllic hills and meadows of the town's more rural sections. Like many other coastal American cities, high society would leave the cities for the summer, and in the case of Boston, many would move to Milton due to its rural qualities, proximity to Boston, its highly active mercantile wharf, and the families' factories in Lower Mills which allowed the tycoons to continue business in the summer months. Most of these estates were concentrated on Milton Hill, Brush Hill, and Upper Canton Avenue. Among the last remaining of these estates that is entirely intact is the W.E.C Eustis Estate at the base of the Blue Hills on Canton Avenue.

The town was also home to America's first piano factory. Revolutionary Milton is the setting of the opening of the 1940 bestselling historical novel Oliver Wiswell by Kenneth Roberts. The Blue Hill Meteorological Observatory is located in the town, home of the nation's oldest continuously kept meteorological records.

The Granite Railway passed from granite quarries in Quincy to the wharf of Milton on the Neponset River, beginning in 1826. It is often called the first commercial railroad in the United States, as it was the first chartered railway to evolve into a common carrier without an intervening closure. A centennial historic plaque from 1926 and an original switch frog and section of track from the railway can be found in the gardens on top of the Southeast Expressway (Interstate 93) as it passes under East Milton Square. The frog had been displayed at the Chicago World's Fair in 1893.

East Milton Square developed as a direct result of the Granite Railway. Quincy granite was seen as of remarkably high quality, and there was an incredibly high demand for it not only in Boston but abroad. Four sheds in East Milton were used to dress the raw granite stone prior to it being brought by rail to the wharf for transfer to boats to send the stones to the Port of Boston to be sent abroad. East Milton Square was originally termed the "Railway Village" and a train station was located there after 1871 when the Granite Railway became a passenger line of the Old Colony Railroad. The Blue Bell Tavern, which was also a hotel, served as the headquarters of the Granite Railway and it was later named the Russell House. It was located on the site of the current United States Post Office in East Milton Square.

In 1801 Josiah Bent began a baking operation in Milton, selling "water crackers" or biscuits made of flour and water that would not deteriorate during long sea voyages from the Port of Boston. A crackling sound occurred during baking, hence the common American term "cracker". His company later sold the original hardtack crackers used by troops during the American Civil War due to their low potential for spoil. The company, Bent's Cookie Factory, is still located in Milton and continues to sell these items to Civil War reenactors and others. However, the original 1801 mill has been turned into residential and commercial space.

Robert Bennet Forbes, a descendant of an old Massachusetts family, was a noted China Trade merchant, sea captain, and philanthropist during the Irish Famine, supporting the large influx of Irish immigrants in Boston despite the elites' distaste for the immigrants. He built a Greek Revival mansion in 1833 at 215 Adams Street on Milton Hill, adjacent to the former site of Thomas Hutchinson's estate. As a prominent example of Greek Revival architecture and possessing many artifacts from the China Trade period, the Captain Robert Bennet Forbes House is now listed on the National Register of Historic Places and is open for tours. The museum's grounds include a log cabin replica and a collection of Lincoln memorabilia acquired by the daughter of Forbes as a result of her adoration and admiration of Abraham Lincoln.

During the mid to late 20th century, the character of the town changed from that of agriculture, industry, and rural retreat for the wealthy to suburban. The population of the town exploded following World War II as the suburbs of America grew rapidly. By the 1950s, many of the big estates were broken into subdivisions as the town's residential growth continued to this day.

George Herbert Walker Bush was born at 173 Adams Street on Milton Hill on June 12, 1924. He became the 41st President of the United States, serving from 1989 to 1993, and his son would become the 43rd President. Coincidentally, Adams Street is named for the family of Presidents John Adams and John Quincy Adams, who lived on the same street just a few miles southeast in Quincy, Massachusetts. The 19th-century Victorian house where President Bush was born is now privately owned and not open to the public.

Geography
As a result of its glacial geological history, many kettle ponds dot the town.

Great Blue Hill in the Blue Hills Reservation is the highest point in Norfolk County and the second-highest elevation within 25 miles of the Atlantic coast, behind Cadillac Mountain in Bar Harbor, Maine. The summit houses the Blue Hill Observatory, home of the longest continuous weather record in North America, along with multiple radio transmitters.

There are no official wards or neighborhoods defined in the town's governance and community planning processes.

There are three GNIS populated places located in the town:
 Milton (42°14'58"N 71°03'58"W),
 Milton Center (42°15'15"N 71°04'48"W), and
 East Milton (42°15'30"N 71°02'33"W).

Although geopolitical lines do not form neighborhoods in Milton, there are many distinct neighborhoods, such as the Columbine Rocks, Indian Cliffs, Scott's Woods, East Milton Square, Blue Hills Parkway, Wadsworth Hill, Brush Hill, Milton Village, Mingo Hill, Cary Hill, and Edge Hill Park, among others.

Climate
Milton, as with most of Massachusetts and New England, has a warm-summer humid continental climate with hot, humid summers, severely cold, snowy winters, mild, wet springs and chilly, brisk falls. It is also often cited as being the windiest city in the United States, with an annual average wind speed of  measured at the Blue Hill Meteorological Observatory.

Demographics

As of the census of 2010, there were 27,002 people, 9,274 households, and 6,835 families residing in the town. The racial makeup of the town was 77.4% White, 14.3% Black or African American, 0.1% Native American, 4.1% Asian, 0.0% Pacific Islander, 0.6% from other races, and 2.5% from two or more races. Hispanic or Latino of any race were 3.3% of the population.

The top six ancestries of Milton are Irish (38.0%), Italian (11.3%), English (8.6%), West Indian (4.8%), and German (4.7%).

Milton also has been cited as having the highest percentage of residents citing Irish lineage of any town in the United States per capita—38%.

There were 8,982 households, out of which 37.5% had children under the age of 18 living with them, 60.1% were married couples living together, 11.9% had a female householder with no husband present, and 24.8% were non-families. Of all households 21.2% were made up of individuals, and 12.7% had someone living alone who was 65 years of age or older. The average household size was 2.79 and the average family size was 3.27.

In the town, the population was spread out, with 25.8% under the age of 18, 8.0% from 18 to 24, 25.9% from 25 to 44, 24.1% from 45 to 64, and 16.2% who were 65 years of age or older. The median age was 39 years. For every 100 females, there were 89.7 males. For every 100 females age 18 and over, there were 84.2 males.

According to a 2010 estimate, the median income for a household in the town was $103,373, wealthy compared to Massachusetts and the United States as a whole. The median income for a family was $131,025. Males had a median income of $85,748 versus $61,500 for females. The per capita income for the town was $47,589. About 1.6% of families and 2.8% of the population were below the poverty line, including 2.2% of those under age 18 and 4.5% of those age 65 or over.

With a mean house price of $932,761, the town has one of the highest costs of living in Massachusetts.

Education

There are six public schools in Milton, including four elementary schools: Collicot, Cunningham, Glover, and Tucker; one middle school, Pierce Middle School; and a public high school, Milton High School. Milton Public Schools are often considered among the best public school systems in Massachusetts.

There are also several private schools, including an elite boarding prep school Milton Academy, a girls' school Fontbonne Academy, and Catholic schools including St. Mary of the Hills School and  St. Agatha's School. Other private schools include the Thacher Montessori School, Carriage House School, and Delphi Academy.

Milton is also home to Curry College, a small liberal arts institution.

Milton is also one of the few school systems in the United States to offer a French immersion program, starting in Grade 1. For those students that participate in this program, all classes are taught in French during grades 1 and 2, allowing children to become fluent in this language. In grades 3–5, some classes are taught in English as well to prepare for the MCAS. This program continues through grade 12. Spanish/English is taught as well. In middle school and high school, Latin is available as an alternative to Spanish for the Spanish/English students.

Transportation
Milton lies within the Massachusetts Bay Transportation Authority district. Fixed-route service includes the Ashmont-Mattapan High Speed Line, a light rail extension of the Red Line. Milton has 4 stops: Milton, Central Avenue, Valley Road, and Capen Street. This was originally a steam railway prior to becoming a trolley line. Massachusetts Route 28 and Massachusetts Route 138 run north and south across Milton, and Interstate 93, which is also U.S. Route 1 and Massachusetts Route 3, loops around the town near the southern and eastern borders.

Cycling is a popular form of transportation and recreation in Milton. The opening of the Neponset River Greenway reconnected Milton with Boston Harbor via Port Norfolk, Dorchester. Other cycling routes and locations include Turner's Pond, Brook Road, Blue Hills Parkway, Milton Cemetery, and the Pine Tree Brook greenway.

The Milton Yacht Club began in 1902, with a small building in the Lower Mills area beside the Neponset River that was formerly the police department for the town of Milton. Various boats continue to be anchored there or stored on the dock during the winter.

Notable people

Sophia French Palmer, Nurse, first editor-in-chief of the American Journal of Nursing, and health administrator
Dana Barros, NBA player, Boston Celtics, Seattle SuperSonics
Jonathan Belcher, governor of Massachusetts Bay, New Hampshire, and New Jersey Provinces
Josiah Bent, manufacturer, founder of G.H. Bent Company Factory
Tim Bulman, Boston College and NFL player, was born in Milton
George H. W. Bush, 41st President of the United States, was born in Milton
Brian Camelio, musician and crowdfunding pioneer, founder of ArtistShare
Ken Casey, bassist and co-lead vocalist of Celtic punk rock group Dropkick Murphys
Chris Cleary, professional soccer player
Hal Clement, science-fiction writer
Jill Ker Conway, Australian-born novelist
Stephen Davis, music journalist and biographer
T. S. Eliot, poet, was a student at Milton Academy
William Ralph Emerson, known for shingle style architecture
Jim Fahey, NHL player, New Jersey Devils
Thomas Flatley, real-estate developer
Elbie Fletcher, All-Star first baseman for Pittsburgh Pirates
John Ferruggio, led evacuation of Pan Am Flight 93 in 1970
John Murray Forbes, railroad magnate, merchant, philanthropist and abolitionist
Robert Bennet Forbes, sea captain, China merchant, ship owner, and writer
Buckminster Fuller, architect and futurist; born in Milton
George V. Higgins, attorney, crime novelist, The Friends of Eddie Coyle
Rich Hill, pitcher for Boston Red Sox, was born in Milton
Thomas Hutchinson, 18th Century governor of Massachusetts Bay province
Abigail Johnson, president of Fidelity Investments
Charles C. Johnson, far-right political activist
Edward Johnson III, businessman
Howard Deering Johnson, restaurateur, founder of Howard Johnson's franchising
Trish Karter, entrepreneur
Jordan Knight, singer for band New Kids on the Block
Janet Langhart, model and journalist
Johnny Martorano, Winter Hill Gang member
Jidenna Theodore Mobisson, attended Milton Academy
Charles Munch, music director of Boston Symphony Orchestra
Kate O'Neill, distance runner
William Ordway Partridge, sculptor, poet, and author
Deval Patrick, former Governor of Massachusetts, attended Milton Academy
Diane Patrick, former First Lady of Massachusetts
Everett P. Pope, Medal of Honor recipient; born in Milton
Mike Ryan, NHL player, Buffalo Sabres
William Saltonstall, eighth principal of Phillips Exeter Academy
Jenny Slate, comedian on Saturday Night Live
Jen Statsky, TV writer and comedian
Margaret Sutermeister (1875–1950), photographer
Luis Tiant, former Boston Red Sox pitcher
Steve Trapilo, former NFL player for New Orleans Saints
Ronan Tynan, Irish tenor
Mark Vonnegut, writer, son of author Kurt Vonnegut
Roger Vose, U.S. Representative from New Hampshire
Barry Wood, Harvard quarterback in College Football Hall of Fame; born in Milton
Keith Yandle, NHL player, Florida Panthers; born in Milton

Points of interest
Milton has 30 sites or districts listed on the National Register of Historic Places, including the following:
 Blue Hill Meteorological Observatory
 Captain Robert Bennet Forbes House
 Governor Hutchinson's Field
 Granite Railway
 Suffolk Resolves House
Other places of interest include:
 Blue Hills Reservation
Eustis Estate
 Houghton's Pond
 Milton Academy
 Curry College
 Carriage House School
 Gunpowder House

Notes

1. "TOTAL POPULATION Survey/Program: Decennial Census, Years: 2010, U.S. Census Bureau." Retrieved 2020-06-03 https://data.census.gov/cedsci/table?q=population%20milton,%20ma&g=1600000US2541725&hidePreview=false&tid=DECENNIALSF12010.P1&vintage=2018&layer=VT_2018_160_00_PY_D1&cid=DP05_0001E

References

 Massachusetts Observed Climate Normals (1981–2010)
 The History of Milton, Mass., 1640–1887 by Albert Kendall Teele, published 1886, 688 pages.
 Milton Records: Births, Marriages and Deaths, 1662–1843. Published 1900.
 Dutton, E.P. Chart of Boston Harbor and Massachusetts Bay with Map of Adjacent Country. Published 1867. A good map of roads and rail lines around Milton including the Granite Railroad.
Old USGS Maps of Milton area.
 https://web.archive.org/web/20081013100415/http://www.muninetguide.com/schools/MA/Milton/Tucker/
 https://web.archive.org/web/20080907194054/http://www.muninetguide.com/schools/MA/Milton/Collicot/
 https://www.townofmilton.org/people/michael-d-dennehy

External links

 Official Milton homepage
 Milton Historical Society homepage

 
Irish-American culture in Massachusetts
Irish-American history
Streetcar suburbs
Towns in Massachusetts
Towns in Norfolk County, Massachusetts